Valley Township may refer to:

Arkansas
 Valley Township, Cleburne County, Arkansas, in Cleburne County, Arkansas
 Valley Township, Hot Spring County, Arkansas, in Hot Spring County, Arkansas
 Valley Township, Madison County, Arkansas
 Valley Township, Ouachita County, Arkansas, in Ouachita County, Arkansas
 Valley Township, Pope County, Arkansas
 Valley Township, Washington County, Arkansas, in Washington County, Arkansas

Illinois
 Valley Township, Stark County, Illinois

Iowa
 Valley Township, Guthrie County, Iowa
 Valley Township, Page County, Iowa
 Valley Township, Pottawattamie County, Iowa

Kansas
 Valley Township, Barber County, Kansas
 Valley Township, Ellsworth County, Kansas
 Valley Township, Hodgeman County, Kansas
 Valley Township, Kingman County, Kansas
 Valley Township, Lincoln County, Kansas, in Lincoln County, Kansas
 Valley Township, Linn County, Kansas, in Linn County, Kansas
 Valley Township, Miami County, Kansas, in Miami County, Kansas
 Valley Township, Osborne County, Kansas, in Osborne County, Kansas
 Valley Township, Phillips County, Kansas, in Phillips County, Kansas
 Valley Township, Reno County, Kansas, in Reno County, Kansas
 Valley Township, Rice County, Kansas
 Valley Township, Scott County, Kansas, in Scott County, Kansas
 Valley Township, Sheridan County, Kansas
 Valley Township, Smith County, Kansas, in Smith County, Kansas

Michigan
 Valley Township, Allegan County, Michigan

Minnesota
 Valley Township, Marshall County, Minnesota

Missouri
 Valley Township, Macon County, Missouri

Nebraska
 Valley Township, Buffalo County, Nebraska
 Valley Township, Knox County, Nebraska

North Dakota
 Valley Township, Barnes County, North Dakota
 Valley Township, Dickey County, North Dakota, in Dickey County, North Dakota
 Valley Township, Kidder County, North Dakota, in Kidder County, North Dakota

Ohio
 Valley Township, Guernsey County, Ohio
 Valley Township, Scioto County, Ohio

Oklahoma
 Valley Township, Canadian County, Oklahoma
 Valley Township, Grant County, Oklahoma
 Valley Township, Pawnee County, Oklahoma
 Valley Township, Woods County, Oklahoma

Pennsylvania
Valley Township, Armstrong County, Pennsylvania
Valley Township, Chester County, Pennsylvania
Valley Township, Montour County, Pennsylvania

South Dakota
 Valley Township, Beadle County, South Dakota, in Beadle County, South Dakota
 Valley Township, Day County, South Dakota, in Day County, South Dakota
 Valley Township, Douglas County, South Dakota, in Douglas County, South Dakota
 Valley Township, Hughes County, South Dakota, in Hughes County, South Dakota
 Valley Township, Hutchinson County, South Dakota, in Hutchinson County, South Dakota
 Valley Township, Hyde County, South Dakota, in Hyde County, South Dakota
 Valley Township, Tripp County, South Dakota, in Tripp County, South Dakota

See also
Valley (disambiguation)

Township name disambiguation pages